This is a list of Chinese national-type primary schools (SJK(C)) in Pahang, Malaysia. As of June 2022, there are 75 Chinese primary schools with a total of 16,629 students.

List of Chinese national-type primary schools in Pahang

Bentong District

Cameron Highlands District

Jerantut District

Lipis District

Kuantan District

Pekan District

Raub District

Temerloh District

Rompin District

Maran District

Bera District

See also 

 Lists of Chinese national-type primary schools in Malaysia

References

 
Schools in Pahang
Pahang
Chinese-language schools in Malaysia